Pterostemma is a genus of flowering plants from the orchid family, Orchidaceae. It contains 3 known species, native to Colombia and Ecuador.

Species accepted as of June 2014:

Pterostemma antioquiense F.Lehm. & Kraenzl.
Pterostemma benzingii (Dodson) M.W.Chase & N.H.Williams
Pterostemma escobarii (Dodson) M.W.Chase & N.H.Williams

See also 
 List of Orchidaceae genera

References

External links 

Orchids of South America
Oncidiinae genera
Oncidiinae